The 55-300mm 4.5-5.6G AF-S lens is a telephoto superzoom lens manufactured by Nikon for its line of DX DSLR cameras.

As with other DX format lenses, the smaller image circle makes it compatible only with APS-C-sized image sensors. If used on a 35mm film SLR, vignetting will occur; however, it can be used on an FX camera because it will automatically enter "DX Crop Mode", which will eliminate vignetting, but also reduce the image area of an FX sensor to a DX sensor.

The lens was designed to be a significant upgrade to the 55-200mm VR, released in 2007, by adding 100mm of focal length and using VR II (vibration reduction). The lens was also designed to be a companion to the 18-55mm VR lens and is also Nikon's most affordable lens with a maximum 300mm focal length.

Features

The lens is equipped with Nikon's Silent Wave Motor (SWM) to operate the autofocus drive quickly and quietly (which denotes the "AF-S" on the lens body).

The lens uses Nikon's second-generation Vibration Reduction (VR II) technology for image stabilization (which denotes the "VR" on the lens body).

It also has two lens elements made of Nikon's Extra-Low Dispersion Glass (ED) (which denotes the "ED" on the lens body) to remove any chromatic aberrations that occur.

All of the optical elements are coated in Nikon's multiple layer Super Integrated Coating (SIC) for scratch, smudge, and dirt resistance.

Nikon designed it with a High Refractive Index (HRI) lens element to reduce its size and maintain optimal contrast across its entire zoom range.

Specifications

Gallery

References

Nikon F-mount lenses